The  was a pulsejet-powered kamikaze ("divine wind") aircraft under development for the Imperial Japanese Navy towards the end of World War II. The war ended before any were built.

History
Nazi Germany supplied the Japanese with a great deal of technical data, including details of the Argus As 014 pulse jet engine. It remains debatable whether that technical data included examples of the V1, let alone the piloted Fieseler Fi 103R (Reichenberg). It is noted that wartime U.S. intelligence reports stated that the Japanese knew of the V-1 by October 1943, and one report stated that Japan received one example in November 1944. The reports also suggested that the Japanese were very interested in the V-1 air-launching techniques as used by the Germans.

One U.S. Army Air Force document from 1946 shows the Baika as being a copy of the Reichenberg. The cargo manifest of the Japanese submarine I-29 lists a single V-1 fuselage as being included in a shipment of equipment. Some contemporary Japanese historians debate on what, if any, V-1 and Fi 103R data the Japanese actually received and whether the Baika may simply have been an independent design.
 
The only tangible outcome of the Axis cooperation, however, was the construction of prototypes of the Maru Ka10 pulse-jet engine which was to power the Baika.

Variants
Type IPulsejet intake located above and behind the cockpit, droppable landing gear. Intended for conventional take off on own power (possibly with the help of droppable rocket boosters).
Type IISimilar to Type I, but with pulsejet moved forwards, no landing gear. Intended for submarine launch.
Type IIIPulsejet mounted ventrally, no landing gear. Presumably, this version was intended to be air-launched by medium bombers such as the Mitsubishi G4M, Nakajima G8N or Yokosuka P1Y.

The currently accepted illustrations of the Baika come from the 1953 published book Koku Gijutsu No Zenbo in which Technical Commander Iwaya (the man who brought the Me 163 and BMW 003 info to Japan) provided drawings of all three versions of the Baika with all versions shown with tricycle landing gear in place.

Specifications (Baika, as designed)

See also

Notes

References

Bibliography

 Dyer, Edwin M. Japanese Secret Projects: Experimental Aircraft of the IJA and IJN 1939–1945. Midland Publishing, 2009. .

Baika
Baika, Kawanishi
Pulsejet-powered aircraft
Baika, Kawanishi
World War II jet aircraft of Japan
Low-wing aircraft